Discosorus,  a genus of the Discosorida and member of the family Discosoridae. Not to be confused with Discoceras. Discosorus consists of rapidly expanding endogastric brevicones, mostly known from isolated siphuncles composed of broadly expanded segments that increase rapidly in size. Septal necks are recumbent, connecting rings thin, bullettes small. The siphuncle interior is occupied by endocones produced by layered annular deposits expanded back toward the apex, leaving a central tube running down the middle. The short phragmocone is poorly known.

Discosorus is found in the Middle Silurian of eastern and arctic North America and as part of the Discosoratidae is derived from the Lowoceratidae which forms a link in the Early Silurian from the Late Ordovician exogastric Faberoceras of the Westonoceratidae.

See also
List of nautiloids

References
Discosorus, pK336 in Vol K of the Treatise on Invertebrate Paleontology in the section on the Discosoridae, pp K335 -K338 in the Chapter on the Discosorida by Curt Teichert starting on page K320

Discosorida
Prehistoric nautiloid genera
Silurian cephalopods
Silurian cephalopods of North America
Paleozoic life of Nunavut
Paleozoic life of Quebec